'Barka Dhakaich', or simply Dhakaich, is a village in Buxar district of Bihar, India. It is located on National Highway 922 (formerly 84), which connects the towns of Ara and Buxar. Agriculture is the main occupation of the people in this village. It has total 4,789 families residing. Asawar has population of 10,144 as per government records.

Administration
Dhakaich village is administrated by Mukhiya through its Gram Panchayat, who is elected representative of village as per constitution of India and Panchyati Raj Act. Dhakaich comes under Simri block.

References

External links
Villages in Buxar Bihar

Villages in Buxar district